Complexly is an American online video and audio production company, based in Missoula, Montana, and Indianapolis, Indiana. Its founders are brothers John and Hank Green (who acts as CEO), who began their Vlogbrothers YouTube channel in 2007. In 2012, the Greens began producing educational video content with the YouTube channels Crash Course and SciShow, and in the years since have created many other channels and podcasts which have been folded into the company. Originally named EcoGeek LLC, it was founded by Hank Green to support his blog on environmental and science issues and was renamed in 2016. Also associated with the Green brothers, but separate from Complexly's operations, are  DFTBA Records, the Project for Awesome, VidCon (acquired by Viacom), and Subbable (acquired by Patreon).  The company's strengths in educational content has led to production funding from Google, PBS, and the Poetry Foundation among other corporations and charitable foundations.

Video productions

Crash Course

Multiple hosts and courses; see main article

Crash Course is an educational YouTube channel providing many courses of study, often based around the AP curriculum of a given subject. The level of study matches that of high school or early college, but the content is available for all ages. Many courses are co-produced with PBS Digital Studios.
The channel launched in 2012, with two subjects, World History and Biology, being taught by John Green and Hank Green, respectively.

SciShow

Multiple hosts and channels; see main article

SciShow is a series of science-related videos, hosted primarily by Hank Green and Michael Aranda. Video topics include breaking scientific news, in-depth analyses of scientific concepts and science history, and science fact compilations.
A spin-off channel, SciShow Space, launched in April 2014 to specialize in space exploration, astronomy, and cosmology. A second spin-off, SciShow Kids, launched in March 2015 to specialize in delivering science topics to children. Kids went on hiatus in late 2018, returning in April 2020. A third spinoff channel was announced in February 2017, SciShow Psych, which debuted in March 2017, specializing in psychology and neuroscience. A podcast, SciShow Tangents, was launched in November 2018; it features entertaining exchanges of scientific facts among many of the shows' staffers, and is directed at a mature audience.

SciShow Kids
Host: Jessi Knudsen Castañeda
Co-host: Anthony Brown (since end of hiatus)

SciShow Kids is a YouTube channel dedicated to science news and topics of interest to grade-school-aged children. SciShow Kids went on hiatus from January 2019 to August 2020.

The Art Assignment

Host: Sarah Urist Green

The Art Assignment is a PBS Digital Studios co-production focused on contemporary art. Initially oriented around 'assignments' given by noted artists to the audience to complete, it has gradually shifted its emphasis to discuss contemporary art in a broader sense.
In 2020, host Sarah Urist Green published a book, You Are an Artist, based on the art assignment concept.

Healthcare Triage
Host: Aaron Carroll

Healthcare Triage is a series about modern healthcare that discusses healthcare policy and medical research, and answers questions about medicine, health, and healthcare.

Eons
Hosts: Blake di Pastino, Kallie Moore, Michelle Barboza-Ramirez (since 2021); formerly Hank Green

Eons is a PBS Digital Studios co-production, a channel about the history of life on Earth.

Journey to the Microcosmos
Hosts: Hank Green, Deboki Chakravarti (since 2021)

Journey to the Microcosmos presents the living collections of microbiologist James Weiss to give a close-up look of microscopic life. Music by Andrew Huang, narrated by Hank Green.

Ours Poetica
Host: Various

Ours Poetica captures the intimate experience of holding a poem in your hands and listening as it is read by a distinctive voice. A co-production with The Poetry Foundation, and poet Paige Lewis.

Bizarre Beasts
Host: Hank Green, Sarah Suta

Bizarre Beasts spun off from a monthly Vlogbrothers segment hosted by Hank Green centred on animal species displaying unusual anatomy or behaviour. After a one-year pilot, it was made into its own monthly series on the Bizarre Beasts YouTube channel. Subscribers to the Bizarre Beasts Pin Club receive a pin of each animal featured.

How to Vote in Every State
Host: Hank Green (2016, 2018, 2022), Nicole Sweeney (2020), Evelyn Ngugi (Voter Guide)

How to Vote in Every State was an initiative based around the 2016 United States elections to help voters determine how to properly register and submit their vote. Videos were posted for all 50 states and the District of Columbia, as well as for those in the military, overseas, and in unincorporated territories. The series was re-done two years later for the 2018 United States elections; a further version for the 2020 United States elections was also made, with the assistance of the Poynter Institute's MediaWise project, which also allowed them to augment the channel with an 8-episode Voter Guide series.

Complexly
Host: various

Complexly launched a self-named channel in May 2018, to share themed playlists, post one-off videos and miniseries, and pilot new channels.

Audio productions
In November 2018, Complexly fully launched a co-production arrangement with WNYC Studios for three regular podcasts; two had been produced independently before, one was new (but adapted from an old format). Two years later the co-production was ended, and Complexly now produces the shows on its own.

Dear Hank & John 

Hosts: Hank Green and John Green

Originally launched in 2015, this weekly podcast features Hank and John Green answering questions e-mailed by listeners, giving "dubious" advice and providing weekly news for the planet Mars and the 4th-tier English football club AFC Wimbledon.

SciShow Tangents 
Panel: Hank Green, Sam Schultz, Ceri Riley; formerly Stefan Chin

Adapted from their previous show, Holy Fucking Science, Tangents is a weekly science-based show where SciShow staffers puzzle and entertain each other with fascinating facts. Starting from the May 17, 2022 episode, video recordings of each episode are also posted to YouTube.

Eons: Mysteries of Deep Time 
Host: Blake de Pastino, Kallie Moore, Michelle Barboza-Ramirez

Launched in March 2022, Eons: Mysteries of Deep Time is adapted from the Youtube series PBS Eons, and explores some of the greatest mysteries in natural history.

Productions no longer affiliated with Complexly

The Brain Scoop

Host: Emily Graslie

The Brain Scoop was first created by Hank Green when he visited the zoological museum at the University of Montana and met one of its collections volunteers, Emily Graslie. Her on-camera presence was exceptional, and he launched a channel soon afterward based in that museum with Graslie as host, in January 2013. The channel enjoyed remarkable success and in a matter of months had caught the attention of staffers at the Field Museum in Chicago; Graslie and the program moved there in August 2013. After a period where the Field licensed the program from Green, they eventually purchased all its rights and trademarks; they produced the show in-house until it was wrapped up in 2020.

Mental Floss Video
Hosts: John Green, Elliott Morgan, others

Mental Floss is the video arm of Mental Floss, providing interesting facts centered on one particular subject matter.
Complexly produced the channel's content from 2013 to 2018; from 2019 on, Mental Floss brought its production in-house.

The Financial Diet
Host: Chelsea Fagan

The Financial Diet is a personal finance advice channel, directed toward young adults and particularly young women.

Sexplanations
Host: Lindsey Doe

Sexplanations is a video series explaining sexual topics, hosted by clinical sexologist Dr. Lindsey Doe.

Animal Wonders
Host: Jessi Knudsen Castañeda

Animal Wonders is a video series from the namesake wildlife animal center outside of Missoula. It focuses on the center's 80+ exotic animals, including their care and habitat.

Ceased productions

100 Days
Hosts: John Green, Chris Waters

100 Days was a video series that acted as a personal initiative of John Green, exploring how to 'have a healthy midlife crisis'. He is joined in physical exercises and other feats by his best friend Chris. It ran through the early months of 2017.

The Anthropocene Reviewed 

Host: John Green

A podcast originally launched in January 2018, each episode of The Anthropocene Reviewed features Green reviewing "facets of the human condition on a five-star scale". The name comes from the Anthropocene, the proposed epoch that includes significant human impact on the environment. Episodes typically contain Green reviewing two topics, accompanied by stories on how they have affected his life. The final episode was released in August 2021.

Crash Course Kids
Host: Sabrina Cruz

Crash Course Kids was a bi-weekly show from the producers of Crash Course about grade school science.

How to Adult
Hosts: Hank Green, Rachel Calderon Navarro

How to Adult was a general advice channel directed toward young adults entering the broader world of adulthood for the first time. The channel was originated in 2014 by T. Michael Martin and Emma Mills who hosted it until August 2016; Complexly revived it with their blessing in March 2017, and the channel aired its final episode in April 2018.

Holy Fucking Science
Host: various

Holy Fucking Science was a science-based entertainment show where four people (typically SciShow staffers, and guests) get together to try to astound and amaze each other with scientific facts and discoveries; it was directed at adults only. Though each episode was filmed and posted to YouTube, it was intended to be enjoyed as a podcast. Their regular sponsor was Montana brewery Big Sky Brewing Company. The show ceased in March 2018 after 58 episodes, with the promise of a similar production to soon replace it; SciShow Tangents took its place in November 2018.

Nature League
Host: Brit Garner

Nature League was an internet show exploring nature; each month had a new theme, and each week a different format.

The Origin of Everything
Host: Danielle Bainbridge

The Origin of Everything was a show about under-told history and culture that challenges our everyday assumptions. Having first launched as a PBS Digital Studios production in 2018, with its second season in 2019 it became a Complexly co-production; following its third season in 2020, PBS cancelled the show.

References

Green brothers
Companies based in Missoula, Montana
Companies based in Indianapolis
Online mass media companies of the United States